Year 1091 (MXCI) was a common year starting on Wednesday (link will display the full calendar) of the Julian calendar.

Events 
 By place 

 Byzantine Empire 
 Spring – Tzachas, a Seljuk Turkish military commander, establishes an independent maritime state centred in the Ionian coastal city of Smyrna (modern-day İzmir). He proclaims himself emperor (basileus), and concludes an alliance with the Pechenegs in Thrace. Tzachas uses his fleet to blockade Constantinople by sea, while the Pechenegs besiege the capital by land.
 April 29 – Battle of Levounion: Emperor Alexios I, supported by his allies, defeats the Pechenegs' 80,000 men (including women and children) at the Evros River, near Enos (modern Turkey). The Cumans and Byzantine forces fall upon the enemy camp, slaughtering all in their path. The Pechenegs are butchered so savagely, that they are almost wiped out.

 Europe 
 Spring – King Stephen II, the last member of the Trpimirović Dynasty, dies without leaving an heir after a 2-year reign. War and unrest breaks out in Croatia afterwards. King Ladislaus I of Hungary, on instigation of his sister, Queen Helena, intervenes in the conflict and occupies Croatia. He proclaims himself king, but is contested by the Croatian nobleman Petar Snačić.
 February – Norman conquest of Sicily: The Normans conquer Noto and complete the 30-year-long conquest of Sicily from the Moorish rulers. Duke Roger Borsa (a son of Robert Guiscard) surrenders his share in the castles of Calabria, and receives his inheritance of Palermo. He grants charters to various towns and encourages urban planning in Apulia and Calabria. 
 Summer – The Norman invasion of Malta: A Norman fleet led by Count Roger I (Bosso) arrives in Malta. Roger disembarks his army, and besieges the island's capital Medina (modern-day Mdina). The inhabitants negotiate peace terms (by promising to pay an annual tribute) and swear an oath of loyalty to Roger. On the way back, the Normans sack the island Gozo.
 July – The Abbadid Dynasty ruling in Al-Andalus (modern Spain) falls, when the Almoravid forces storm Seville. Confronted with this threat, Emir Muhammad ibn Abu Bakr Muhammad al-Aftas of Badajoz obtains the support of King Alfonso VI (the Brave) of Castile, in exchange for the Moorish positions on the Tagus River (Sintra, Santarém and Lisbon).

 Britain and France
 Spring – King William II invades Normandy with a large army. His brothers, Henry and Robert Curthose, mobilizes mercenary forces to resist William during the siege at Mont-Saint-Michel. Henry is forced to surrender his estates of the Cotentin Peninsula in Normandy and signs a peace treaty.
 Summer – King Malcolm III of Scotland invades the north of England, and besieges Durham. The Normans led by William II march north to oppose the Scots, but a conflict is averted. Malcolm is forced to accept the terms of the Treaty of Abernethy (see 1072) and pays homage to William.
 Cardiff Castle is constructed by Robert Fitzhamon, Norman lord of Gloucester (approximate date).

 By topic 

 Disasters 
 October 17 – London tornado: A T8 tornado (roughly equal to an F4 on the Fujita scale) occurs in London. The wooden London Bridge is demolished and the church of St. Mary-le-Bow is badly damaged.

 Religion 
 December – Athanasius VI bar Khamoro becomes (against his will) patriarch and head of the Syriac Orthodox Church in Antioch (until 1129).

Births 
 September 18 – Andronikos Komnenos, Byzantine prince and general
 December 22 – Jutta von Sponheim, German abbess (d. 1136)
 Hongzhi Zhengjue, Chinese Chan Buddhist monk and writer (d. 1157)
 Matilda of Rethel, French noblewoman and sovereign (d. 1151)
 Tiantong Zongjue, Chinese Buddhist monk and patriarch (d. 1162) 
 Wartislaw I (or Warcisław), duke of Pomerania (approximate date)

Deaths 
 March 26 – Wallada bint al-Mustakfi, Andalusian female poet (b. 994)
 June 17 – Dirk V, count of Friesland (west of the Vlie) (b. 1052)
 June 29 – Frederick of Montbéliard, margrave of Turin
 July 5 – William of Hirsau, German abbot and music theorist 
 August 8 – Altmann of Passau, German bishop and saint 
 August 25 – Sisnando Davides, Mozarab military leader
 December 19 
 Adelaide of Susa, margravine of Turin
 Fujiwara no Tadaie, Japanese statesman (b. 1033)
 Fu Yaoyu, Chinese government official and politician (b. 1024)
 Helena of Hungary, queen of Croatia (approximate date)
 Jordan I (or Giordano), Italo-Norman prince of Capua
 Mac meic Aedh Ua Flaithbheartaigh, king of Iar Connacht
 Robert D'Oyly, Norman nobleman (approximate date)
 Stephen II (or Stjepan), king of Croatia (approximate date)
 Wolfhelm of Brauweiler, German Benedictine abbot
 Zaheer-ul-Daulah Artuk Beg, Seljuk general and governor

References